The Asian Cup Winner's Cup (abbreviated as ACWC) was a seasonal football competition held by the Asian Football Confederation (Afc) from 1990 to 2002 between the Asian Cup winners and in parallel with the AFC Cup. In the first four rounds of the Cup, the final match was played. There was a round trip between the finalist teams, but after that and until the end of this final tournament, it was always held as a single game and hosted by one of the two finalist teams or in a neutral country. Persepolis won the first round of the tournament by beating Muharraq. Al-Hilal won the last championship   in 2001–02, defeating Jeonbuk Hyundai Motors. The champion of this cup competed with the champions of the Asian Club Championship  to achieve the Asian Super Cup .

Until 2002, football matches in Asia were held under the two titles of Asian Club Cup champions and Asian Cup winners, but the club organizing committee in this continent; After the end of the tournament in 2001–02, like the European Cup Winners' Cup in the 1998–99 season, by merging these two trophies, to hold the games in the form of the AFC Champions League; From now on, the champions of the Asian League and Cup will participate in the Champions League.Al Hilal  and Nissan FC (Nissan) are the proudest teams in this competition with 2 championships each. The teams of Persepolis and Al-Nassr are also in the next ranks with 1 championship and 1 runner-up each. Saudi Arabia clubs are the record holders of championships in these competitions by winning six titles.

Finals

By nation

By club 
The following table lists clubs by number of times winners and runners-up in Asian Cup Winners' Cup.

1 including Nissan FC.  
2 Yokohama Flügels was merged with Yokohama Marinos to Yokohama F. Marinos in 1999.

Gallery

Related Queries 
 AFC Champions League
 Asian Super Cup
 AFC Cup
 Afro-Asian Club Championship

References

External links
 RSSSF – Asian Cup Winners Cup

 
Defunct Asian Football Confederation club competitions
Lists of association football matches